Dionís Renart i García (Barcelona, 1878 - Barcelona, 1946) was a Catalan sculptor and astronomer.

Biography
He studied at the Llotja School also known as the "Escola d'Arts i Oficis de Barcelona", and later worked in Josep Llimona's studio. He sculpted "Les Tres Maries de La Resurrecció de Jesús" in the First Mystery of Glory section on the "Rosari Monumental de Montserrat", which is the way leading up to the Montserrat Monastery which has a number of religious sculptures and symbols. On this "Les Tres Maries de la Resurrecció de Jesús" also worked Antoni Gaudí and Josep Llimona. He also worked on ceramic models, jars, medals and jewellery in line with the Art Nouveau style. He also server as anatomical sculptor for Barcelona's Medical School.

As an astronomer he was president of the lunar section of Barcelona's Astronomical Society and organizer of the Exhibition on lunar studies of 1912. He was also author of a map of the moon produced by relief stereographic projection. Today a lunar precinct is named after him.

1878 births
1946 deaths
Scientists from Barcelona
Astronomers from Catalonia
Sculptors from Catalonia
Art Nouveau sculptors
20th-century Spanish sculptors
20th-century Spanish astronomers
19th-century Spanish astronomers